We Are Not Alone is the second studio album by American rock band Breaking Benjamin. It was released on June 29, 2004. Three singles were released from the album, "So Cold", "Sooner or Later", and the full-band version of "Rain", as opposed to the original version in which the only instrument used is an acoustic guitar, which came out near the end of June 2005. The album name is a reference to the novel of the same name. We Are Not Alone sold 48,000 copies on its first week and was certified platinum by the RIAA on June 13, 2005. It is the first Breaking Benjamin album to receive a Parental Advisory label.

A Live EP was released with limited editions of the album, containing live recorded versions of "Sugarcoat," "Water," "Medicate," and "Next to Nothing" from their first album Saturate.

We Are Not Alone is the last studio album to feature drummer Jeremy Hummel. The track "Firefly" was featured in the 2004 video games WWE SmackDown! vs. Raw and WWE Day of Reckoning.

According to AllMusic critic Johnny Loftus, the album stylistically incorporates early Tool's sound through post-grunge's more accessible melodics.

Track listing

Personnel

Breaking Benjamin
 Benjamin Burnley – lead vocals, rhythm guitar
 Aaron Fink – lead guitar
 Mark Klepaski – bass guitar
 Jeremy Hummel – drums (except on "Rain")

Additional musicians
 David Bendeth – additional keyboards
 Billy Corgan – additional guitar on "Forget It"
 Wayne Davis – keyboards, programming 
 Chad Szeliga – drums on "Rain"

Artwork
T42Design – art direction and album design
Michael Halsband – band photography

Production
David Bendeth – producer, mixing
Rich Costey – mixing on "So Cold"
Andy Wallace – mixing on "Follow"
Michael Brauer – mixing on "Forget It"
Jason Jordan – A&R
Bladimir Jimenezv – artist coordination
Keith Gary – assistant
John Bender – assistant engineer
Wayne Davis – digital editing
Dan Korneff – digital editing
Jerry Farley – digital editing
J. Colangelo – drum technician
George Marino – mastering
Valerie Zyriek – studio coordinator
Freddie Fabbri – consigliere
James "MO" Butts – sound advice

Chart positions

Weekly charts

Year-end charts

Singles

Certifications

References

2004 albums
Albums produced by David Bendeth
Breaking Benjamin albums
Hollywood Records albums